Mmatshumo is a village in Central District (Botswana) of Botswana. It is located close to Makgadikgadi salt Pan. An area of wide open uninhabited spaces with endless horizons i.e. the remains of what used to be the largest ancient mainland superlake. The village has administrative offices i.e. kgotla currently headed by kgosi Phetsogang, primary school, postoffice, bars (with the famous Land and Camp leading the pack especially during holidays), shops and a health clinic.
In the north of Mmatshumo village lies Khubu Island aka Gaio and in the south of this village lies Damtshaa diamond mine operated by Debswana Company. The road linking Letlhakane in the south to Mmatshumo is tarred. Due to the diamond mining activities in the vicinity of this village, it is expected to see population and business boom in the coming years. According to 2011 Botswana Population and Housing Census, Mmatshumo and associated localities had a total population of 1 650. The contribution from Mmatshumo village alone was 1 122 with 524 males and 598 females.

References 

Populated places in Central District (Botswana)
Villages in Botswana